Robert Charles Edgcumbe, 8th Earl of Mount Edgcumbe (1 June 1939 – 12 June 2021) was a New Zealand-British peer. 

Edgcumbe was the son of Meta Lhoyer and George Aubrey Valletort Edgcumbe. He was educated at Nelson College from 1951 to 1955. He married Joan Ivy Wall, daughter of Ernest Wall in 1960 and together they had five daughters. They divorced in 1988. The Earl then lived with Beryl Cottrell, from Millbrook who he later married in 2017.  He succeeded to his titles in 1982. He was an estate manager in New Zealand. Members of the Edgcumbe family have lived in New Zealand since the 1860s.

The earl and his immediate predecessor both moved to Cornwall on succeeding to the title. The earl's family live in both New Zealand and Cornwall, where he lived in Empacombe House, Cornwall. 

Upon his death in 2021, the earl was succeeded by his half-brother Piers Valletort Edgcumbe.

Estate
The former home of the Edgcumbe family was Mount Edgcumbe House, Cornwall, overlooking Plymouth Sound. An earlier family seat was Cotehele, also in Cornwall. The family has owned the estate since 1354 when William de Eggecomb married Hillaria, daughter and heiress of William de Cotehele.

Mount Edgcumbe house was severely damaged by incendiary bombs in 1941. It was rebuilt for the sixth earl, and was lived in by the Earls of Mount Edgcumbe until 1987.

See also
Great Cornish Families

References

External links

1939 births
2021 deaths
8
New Zealand emigrants to the United Kingdom
New Zealand recipients of a British peerage
People educated at Nelson College
New Zealand people of English descent
Mount Edgcumbe